Georgy Petrusov (1903  1971) was a Soviet photographer. His photographs were exhibited at the Multimedia Art Museum, Moscow in 2010–2011.

References

External links
http://www.rusartnet.com/biographies/russian-artists/20th-century/modern/soviet/photographer/georgy-petrusov
https://www.icp.org/browse/archive/constituents/georgi-petrusov

1903 births
1971 deaths
Soviet photographers